This is a list of battalions of the Cameronians (Scottish Rifles), which existed as an infantry regiment of the British Army from 1881 to 1968.

Original composition
When the 26th (Cameronian) Regiment of Foot, and 90th Perthshire Light Infantry amalgamated to form The Cameronians (Scottish Rifles) in 1881 under the Cardwell-Childers reforms of the British Armed Forces, seven pre-existent militia and volunteer battalions of Lanarkshire and Dumfries and Galloway were integrated into the structure of the regiment. Volunteer battalions had been created in reaction to a perceived threat of invasion by France in the late 1850s. Organised as "rifle volunteer corps", they were independent of the British Army and composed primarily of the middle class. The only change to the regiment's structure during the period of 1881-1908 occurred in 1897, when the 5th Volunteer Battalion was disbanded as a result of poor discipline.

Reorganisation

The Territorial Force (later Territorial Army) was formed in 1908, which the volunteer battalions joined, while the militia battalions transferred to the "Special Reserve". All volunteer battalions were renumbered to create a single sequential order.

First World War

The Cameronians fielded 28 battalions and lost 7,106 officers and other ranks during the course of the war. The regiment's territorial components formed duplicate second and third line battalions. As an example, the three-line battalions of the 5th Cameronians were numbered as the 1/5th, 2/5th, and 3/5th respectively, with the third line battalions, being redesignated reserve battalions in 1916. Many battalions of the regiment were formed as part of Secretary of State for War Lord Kitchener's appeal for an initial 100,000 men volunteers in 1914. They were referred to as the New Army or Kitchener's Army. The New Army, 13th (Service) battalion, was referred to as a "Pals" battalion because it was predominantly composed of colleagues. The Volunteer Training Corps were raised with overage or reserved occupation men early in the war, and were initially self-organised into many small corps, with a wide variety of names. Recognition of the corps by the authorities brought regulation and as the war continued the small corps were formed into battalion sized units of the county Volunteer Regiment. In 1918 these were linked to county regiments.

Inter-War
By 1920, all of the regiment's war-raised battalions had disbanded. The Special Reserve reverted to its militia designation in 1921, then to the Supplementary Reserve in 1924; however, its battalions were effectively placed in 'suspended animation'.

As World War II approached, the Territorial Army was reorganised in the mid-1930s, many of its infantry battalions were converted to other roles, especially anti-aircraft.

Second World War
The regiment's expansion during the Second World War was modest compared to 1914–1918. National Defence Companies were combined to create a new "Home Defence" battalion, In addition six battalions of the Home Guard were affiliated to the regiment, wearing its cap badge.  One Light Anti-Aircraft (LAA) troop was formed from a local battalion to defend a factory. Due to the daytime (or shift working) occupations of the men in the LAA troop, it required eight times the manpower of an equivalent regular unit.

Post-World War II

In the immediate post-war period, the army was significantly reduced: nearly all infantry regiments had their first and second battalions amalgamated and the Supplementary Reserve disbanded.

Disbandment
After the 1966 Defence White Paper, the Cameronians decided to disband rather than be amalgamated. This meant that only the Territorial elements of the regiment, carried on the lineage, until 1997 when the last remaining company was rebadged and the Cameronians came to an end.

References

Bibliography
 Sir James Moncrieff Grierson, Records of the Scottish Volunteer Force, 1859-1908, W. Blackwood and sons, 1909

Cameronians (Scottish Rifles)
Cameronians (Scottish Rifles), List of battalions
Cameronians (Scottish Rifles)
Cameronians (Scottish Rifles)
Battalions